An honorary degree is an academic degree for which a university (or other degree-awarding institution) has waived all of the usual requirements. It is also known by the Latin phrases honoris causa ("for the sake of the honour") or ad honorem  ("to the honour"). The degree is typically a doctorate or, less commonly, a master's degree, and may be awarded to someone who has no prior connection with the academic institution or no previous postsecondary education. An example of identifying a recipient of this award is as follows: Doctorate in Business Administration (Hon. Causa).

The degree is often conferred as a way of honouring a distinguished visitor's contributions to a specific field or to society in general.

It is sometimes recommended that such degrees be listed in one's curriculum vitae (CV) as an award, and not in the education section. With regard to the use of this honorific, the policies of institutions of higher education generally ask that recipients "refrain from adopting the misleading title" and that a recipient of an honorary doctorate should restrict the use of the title "Dr" before their name to any engagement with the institution of higher education in question and not within the broader community.

Historical origins
The practice dates back to the Middle Ages, when for various reasons a university might be persuaded, or otherwise see fit, to grant exemption from some or all of the usual statutory requirements for the award of a degree. The earliest honorary degree on record was awarded to Lionel Woodville in the late 1470s by the University of Oxford. He later became Bishop of Salisbury.

In the late 16th century, the granting of honorary degrees became quite common, especially on the occasion of royal visits to Oxford or Cambridge. On the visit of James I to Oxford in 1605, for example, forty-three members of his retinue (fifteen of whom were earls or barons) received the degree of Master of Arts, and the Register of Convocation explicitly states that these were full degrees, carrying the usual privileges (such as voting rights in Convocation and Congregation).

There were also some special cases: for example the critic John Ruskin suffered some kind of physical or mental breakdown in 1840 and dropped out of the University of Oxford. He returned to Oxford in 1842, and sat a single exam, and was awarded an honorary fourth-class degree.

In the United States, the Doctor of Philosophy (Ph.D.) degree was first conferred as an honorary degree, at Bucknell University in 1852; not until 1861 did any American university award an earned Ph.D. (Yale University being the first to do so). Over one hundred institutions in the United States conferred honorary Ph.D. degrees to more than seven hundred persons in the 19th century. The practice of awarding the Ph.D. as an honorary degree drew condemnation from organizations such as the American Philological Association and the American Association for the Advancement of Science, and the board of regents of the University of the State of New York prohibited any university in the state from conferring an honorary Ph.D. effective in 1897. The number of honorary Ph.D. degrees awarded in the U.S. declined in the 20th century, and surveys by the United States Office of Education found none conferred in 1940 or later years. One of the last known recipients of an honorary Ph.D. was singer Bing Crosby, from Gonzaga University in 1937.

Modern practice
Honorary degrees are usually awarded at regular graduation ceremonies, at which the recipients are often invited to make a speech of acceptance before the assembled faculty and graduates – an event which often forms the highlight of the ceremony. Generally, universities nominate several persons each year for honorary degrees; these nominations usually go through several committees before receiving approval. Nominees are generally not told until a formal approval and invitation are made; often it is perceived that the system is shrouded in secrecy, and occasionally seen as political and controversial. On occasion, organisations have been awarded honorary doctorates.

The term honorary degree is a slight misnomer: honoris causa degrees are not considered of the same standing as substantive degrees earned by the standard academic processes of courses and original research, except perhaps where the recipient has demonstrated an appropriate level of academic scholarship that would ordinarily qualify him or her for the award of a substantive degree. Recipients of honorary degrees typically wear the same academic dress as recipients of substantive degrees, although there are a few exceptions: honorary graduates at the University of Cambridge wear the appropriate full-dress gown but not the hood, and those at the University of St Andrews wear a black cassock instead of the usual full-dress gown.

An ad eundem or jure officii degree is sometimes considered honorary, although these are only conferred on an individual who has already achieved a comparable qualification at another university or attained an office requiring the appropriate level of scholarship. Under certain circumstances, a degree may be conferred on an individual for both the nature of the office they hold and the completion of a dissertation. The "dissertation et jure dignitatis" is considered to be a full academic degree. See below.

Although higher doctorates such as Doctor of Science, Doctor of Letters, etc. are often awarded honoris causa, in many countries (notably England and Scotland, Ireland, Australia, and New Zealand) it is formally possible to earn such a degree as a substantive one. This typically involves the submission of a portfolio of peer-refereed research, usually undertaken over a number of years, which has made a substantial contribution to the academic field in question. The university will appoint a panel of examiners who will consider the case and prepare a report recommending whether or not the degree be awarded. Usually, the applicant must have some strong formal connection with the university in question, for example full-time academic staff, or graduates of several years' standing.

Some universities, seeking to differentiate between substantive and honorary doctorates, have a degree (often DUniv, or Doctor of the University) which is used for these purposes, with the other higher doctorates reserved for formally examined academic scholarship.

The Archbishop of Canterbury has the authority to award degrees. These "Lambeth degrees" are sometimes, erroneously, thought to be honorary; however the archbishops have for many centuries had the legal authority (originally as the representatives of the Pope, later confirmed by a 1533 Act of Henry VIII), to award degrees and regularly do so to people who have either passed an examination or are deemed to have satisfied the appropriate requirements.

Between the two extremes of honoring celebrities and formally assessing a portfolio of research, some universities use honorary degrees to recognize achievements of intellectual rigor. Some institutes of higher education do not confer honorary degrees as a matter of policy—see below. Some learned societies award honorary fellowships in the same way as honorary degrees are awarded by universities, for similar reasons.

Practical use

A typical example of university regulations is, "Honorary graduates may use the approved post-nominal letters. It is not customary, however, for recipients of an honorary doctorate to adopt the prefix 'Dr. In some universities, it is however a matter of personal preference for an honorary doctor to use the formal title of "Doctor", regardless of the background circumstances for the award. Written communications where an honorary doctorate has been awarded may include the letters "h.c." after the award to indicate that status.

The recipient of an honorary degree may add the degree title postnominally, but it should always be made clear that the degree is honorary by adding "honorary" or "honoris causa" or "h.c." in parentheses after the degree title. In some countries, a person who holds an honorary doctorate may use the title "Doctor" prenominally, abbreviated "Dr.h.c." or "Dr.(h.c.)". Sometimes, they use "Hon" before the degree letters, for example, "Hon DMus".

In recent years, some universities have adopted entirely separate postnominal titles for honorary degrees. This is in part due to the confusion that honorary degrees have caused. For example, an honorary doctorate from the Auckland University of Technology takes the special title HonD since it is now common in certain countries to use certain degrees, such as LLD or HonD, as purely honorary. Some universities, including the Open University, grant Doctor of the University (DUniv) degrees to selected nominees, while awarding PhD or EdD degrees to those who have fulfilled the academic requirements.

Most American universities award the degrees of LLD (Doctor of Laws), LittD (Doctor of Letters), LHD (Doctor of Humane Letters), ScD (Doctor of Science), PedD (Doctor of Pedagogy) and DD (Doctor of Divinity) only as honorary degrees. American universities do not have the system of "higher doctorates" used in the UK and some other universities around the world.

Customary degrees (ad eundem or jure officii degrees)

Some universities and colleges have the custom of awarding a master's degree to every scholar appointed as a full professor, who had never earned a degree there. At the universities of Oxford, Dublin and Cambridge, many senior staff are granted the degree of Master of Arts after three years of service, and at Amherst College all tenured professors are awarded a Master of Arts degree at an academic convocation in the autumn, even though the school only offers an earned Bachelor of Arts degree (Amherst awards honorary doctorates at commencement in the spring to notable scholars and other special invitees). Schools such as Brown University, the University of Pennsylvania and Harvard University also award tenured faculty, who do not have a degree from their respective schools, the AM ad eundem.

These ad eundem or jure officii degrees are earned degrees, not honorary, because they recognize formal learning.

Similarly, a jure dignitatis degree is awarded to someone who has demonstrated eminence and scholarship by being appointed to a particular office. Thus, for example, a DD (Doctor of Divinity) might be conferred upon a bishop on the occasion of his consecration, or a judge created LLD (Legum Doctor) or DCL (Doctor of Civil Law) upon his or her appointment to the judicial bench. These, also, are properly considered substantive rather than honorary degrees.

Institutions not awarding honorary degrees
Some US universities such as the Massachusetts Institute of Technology (MIT), Cornell University, Stanford University, and Rice University, do not award honorary degrees as a matter of policy. The University of Virginia (founded in 1819) was probably the first US university to explicitly have a policy of not awarding honorary degrees at the behest of its founder, Thomas Jefferson. In 1845, William Barton Rogers, then chairman of the faculty, vigorously defended this policy; in 1861, he founded MIT in Boston and continued this practice. The University of Virginia does annually award Thomas Jefferson Medals in Architecture and in Law, as the highest honors accorded by that institution.

The Stanford Alumni Association occasionally awards the Degree of Uncommon Man/Woman to individuals who have given "rare and exceptional service" to the university. Though UCLA has imposed a moratorium on awarding honorary degrees, it honors notable people with the UCLA Medal instead. St. John's College has not granted honorary degrees since 1936, but its alumni association occasionally offers honorary membership to retiring faculty, staff, and other close associates of the college.

Controversy

Some universities and colleges have been accused of granting honorary degrees in exchange for large donations. Honorary degree recipients, particularly those who have no prior academic qualifications, have sometimes been criticized if they insist on being called "Doctor" as a result of their award, as the honorific may mislead the general public about their qualifications.

In 1985, as a deliberate snub, the University of Oxford voted to refuse Margaret Thatcher an honorary degree in protest against her cuts in funding for higher education. This award had previously been given to all prime ministers who had been educated at Oxford.

The Philosophy Faculty at Cambridge courted controversy among the academic community in March 1992, when three of its members posed a temporary veto against the awarding of an honorary doctorate to Jacques Derrida; they and other non-Cambridge proponents of analytic philosophy protested against the granting on the grounds that Derrida's work "did not conform with accepted measures of academic rigor." Although the university eventually passed the motion, the episode did more to draw attention to the continuing antipathy between the analytic (of which Cambridge's faculty is a leading exponent) and the post-Hegelian continental philosophical traditions (with which Derrida's work is more closely associated).

In 1996, Southampton College at Long Island University (now a campus of Stony Brook University) awarded an Honorary Doctorate of Amphibious Letters to Muppet Kermit the Frog. Although some students objected to awarding a degree to a Muppet, Kermit delivered an enjoyable commencement address and the small college received considerable press coverage. The degree was conferred in recognition of efforts in the area of environmentalism. The university stated: "His theme song, 'It's Not Easy Bein' Green,' has become a rallying cry of the environmental movement. Kermit has used his celebrity to spread positive messages in public service announcements for the National Wildlife Federation, National Park Service, the Better World Society, and others."

The awarding of an honorary degree to political figures can prompt protests from faculty or students. In 2001, George W. Bush received an honorary degree from Yale University, where he had earned his bachelor's degree in history in 1968. Some students and faculty chose to boycott the university's 300th commencement. Andrew Card, who served as Bush's Chief of Staff from 2001 to 2006, ultimately chose not to speak when the University of Massachusetts Amherst awarded him an honorary degree in 2007, in response to protests from students and faculty at the commencement ceremonies.

In 2005 at the University of Western Ontario, Henry Morgentaler, a gynecologist involved in a legal case decriminalizing abortion in Canada (R. v. Morgentaler), was made an honorary Doctor of Laws. Over 12,000 signatures were acquired asking the UWO to reverse its decision to honor Morgentaler. Several protest rallies were held, including one on the day the honorary degree was bestowed (a counter petition to support Morgentaler's degree gained 10,000 signatures).

In 2007, protesters demanded that the University of Edinburgh revoke an honorary degree awarded to Zimbabwean leader Robert Mugabe in 1984. The university subsequently revealed plans to review its honorary degree policy and strip certain figures of their honorary degrees who did not deserve them. When considering revoking the honorary degree of a political figure, such reasons as human rights abuse or political corruption would be considered. As a result, it was announced that Mugabe had been stripped of his honorary degree. The university also planned to have a more rigorous selection procedure regarding potential recipients of honorary degrees, in an attempt to rectify the trend of awarding degrees to celebrities. Students at the University of Massachusetts Amherst also
asked the university to revoke the honorary degree that was awarded to Mugabe over twenty years ago, and on 12 June 2008 the trustees unanimously rescinded Robert Mugabe's honorary degree. Michigan State University has also rescinded its honorary degree.

In April 2009, Arizona State University's president, Michael M. Crow, refused to give an honorary degree to US President Barack Obama for his lack of adequate qualifying achievements thus far. Also, controversy was ignited about Notre Dame awarding Obama an honorary degree, as the institution is Roman Catholic and Obama holds pro-choice views on abortion and supports embryonic stem cell research.

In February 2012, Rosmah Mansor, the wife of the Prime Minister of Malaysia, Najib Razak was controversially awarded an honorary doctorate by the Curtin University for "services to childhood education". The university honored Rosmah for founding and driving the Permata early childhood centres in Malaysia although some alumni and students contended that the government-funded centres are "an abuse of taxpayers' money".

Over 50 honorary degrees awarded to Bill Cosby have been rescinded due to allegations and lawsuits of sexual assault.

Use of title associated with honorary doctorates
By convention, recipients of honorary doctorates do not use the title "Dr" in general correspondence, although in formal correspondence from the university issuing the honorary degree it is normal to address the recipient by the title, at least in the United States. However, this social convention is not always scrupulously observed. Notable people who have used the honorary prefix include:

 Maya Angelou, a memoirist and poet who had no earned degrees, but she received dozens of honorary ones and she preferred to be called "Dr. Angelou" by people other than family and close friends.
 Stephen Colbert, who received an honorary doctorate in fine arts from Knox College in 2006, frequently made light of the concept of an "honorary doctor" by offering up scurrilous medical advice in a segment called "Cheating Death" on his television program The Colbert Report after being awarded a D.F.A.
 Benjamin Franklin, who received an honorary master's degree from The College of William and Mary in 1756, and doctorates from the University of St. Andrews in 1759 and the University of Oxford in 1762 for his scientific accomplishments. He thereafter referred to himself as "Doctor Franklin".
 Alan García, former Peruvian president and politician, who for many years held the title of Dr. in official presentations as head of state and as a civilian throughout his political career. Heavily criticized by the media when discovering his last degree to be a master's in economic development and not completing his doctoral studies in law, he was awarded an honorary doctorate from the University of Delhi in 1987, while making an official visit to India in his first term as president.
 Samuel Johnson, an author and lexicographer, who had some years earlier been unable (due to financial considerations) to complete his undergraduate studies at Pembroke College, Oxford, was awarded the degree of Master of Arts by diploma in 1755, in recognition of his scholarly achievements. In 1765, Trinity College, Dublin awarded him the degree of Doctor of Laws and in 1775 Oxford bestowed upon him the degree of Doctor of Civil Law by diploma.
 Edwin H. Land, who invented the Land Camera instant camera, and was a co-founder of the Polaroid Corporation, received an honorary doctorate from Harvard University and was often referred to as "Dr. Land", though he did not have any earned degree.
 Richard Stallman, the founder of the Free Software Foundation in the field of information technology, has been awarded fourteen honorary doctorates from various international educational institutions from 1996 through 2014 including the North American Lakehead University in 2009, and now refers to himself as "Dr. Richard Stallman" in speeches, talks, videos, and email.
 Sukarno, the first president of Indonesia, was awarded 26 honorary doctorates from various international universities including Columbia University, the University of Michigan, the University of Berlin, the Al-Azhar University, the University of Belgrade, the Lomonosov University and many more; and also from domestic universities, including the Universitas Gadjah Mada, the Universitas Indonesia, the Bandung Institute of Technology, and the Universitas Padjadjaran. He had often been referred to by the Indonesian Government at the time as "Dr. Ir. Sukarno", combined with his engineer's degree (Ir.) from Bandung Institute of Technology.
 Jeremiah Wolfe, a respected elder of the Eastern Band of Cherokee Indians, taught at the Oconaluftee Job Corps in Cherokee for more than 20 years, and subsequently worked in outreach and education at the Museum of the Cherokee Indian, where he shared his extensive knowledge of tribal history and culture with thousands of visitors. He was awarded an honorary doctorate of humane letters at the commencement at Western Carolina University, 2017.

See also
 Academic degree
 Freedom of the City
 Homage
 Latin honors

References

External links 
 

 
Doctoral degrees